The 2009 Copa Nextel Stock Car season was the 31st Stock Car Brasil season. It began on March 29 at Interlagos and ended on December 6 at same circuit after twelve rounds.

This season introduced a new tubular chassis JL G-09 similar to DTM, replacing the model that was used since 2000. Before the start of the championship, Mitsubishi announced that left the championship. Cacá Bueno won his third championship.

Teams and drivers
All drivers were Brazilian-registered.

Race calendar and results
All races were held in Brazil.

Drivers' championship

References

External links
 Official website of the Stock Car Brasil (In Portuguese)

Stock Car Brasil
Stock Car Brasil seasons